The men's javelin throw was one of six throwing events on the Athletics at the 1908 Summer Olympics programme in London.  The javelin was required to be held in the middle. The competition was held on 17 July 1908. 16 throwers from six nations competed. NOCs could enter up to 12 athletes.

Records

These were the standing world and Olympic records (in metres) prior to this competition. Two days earlier in the freestyle javelin throw event Eric Lemming improved his own world and Olympic record set at the 1906 Summer Olympics with 53.90 m (he threw the javelin in a conventional manner).

(*) unofficial

Eric Lemming set a new world and Olympic record with 54.83 m.

Results

References

Sources
 Official Report of the Games of the IV Olympiad (1908).
 De Wael, Herman. Herman's Full Olympians: "Athletics 1908". Accessed 7 April 2006.

Athletics at the 1908 Summer Olympics
Javelin throw at the Olympics